"August" (stylized in all lowercase) is a song by American singer-songwriter Taylor Swift. It is the eighth track on her eighth studio album Folklore (2020), which was released on July 24, 2020. "August" was written and produced by Swift and Jack Antonoff, with additional production from Joe Alwyn. It is a dream pop and guitar pop ballad with soft rock guitars, strings, and vocal reverberation.

Alongside fellow tracks "Cardigan" and "Betty", "August" constitutes a fictitious love triangle involving three points of view: those of Betty, James, and an unnamed female character. The song is written from the latter's perspective, depicting her sorrow over her derailed summer romance with James, who abandoned her and reconciled with Betty. Swift, in her 2020 concert documentary Folklore: The Long Pond Studio Sessions, said that she personally calls the unnamed narrator "Augustine" or "Augusta".

Critics lauded the song's instrumentation and lyrics, with some of them picking it as a standout on Folklore and a career highlight for Swift. "August" has charted within the top 40 of the singles charts in Australia, Canada, Ireland, Malaysia, Singapore, and the United States. In the US, the song peaked at number 23 on the US Billboard Hot 100 and number five on the Billboard Hot Rock & Alternative Songs. At the 63rd Annual Grammy Awards on March 14, 2021, Swift performed it as part of a medley with "Cardigan" and "Willow", the lead single off of Folklore sister record, Evermore (2020). "August" experiences commercial resurgence in and around months of August.

Background and production 
Taylor Swift and producer Jack Antonoff had written and produced songs for Swift's previous studio albums 1989 (2014), Reputation (2017), and Lover (2019). They collaborated again on Folklore, which Swift surprise-released amid the COVID-19 pandemic in 2020. Folklore was released on July 24, 2020, through Republic Records. Swift wrote or co-wrote all songs on the album, and Swift and Antonoff produced six, including "August". For the song, Antonoff produced the instrumental first, and sent it to Swift who wrote the lyrics "on the spot; it just was an intuitive thing". As with other tracks of Folklore, Swift created "August" based on a fictional narrative with imagined story arcs and characters.

Lyrics and composition 
Swift wrote "August" as part of three Folklore songs (together with "Cardigan" and "Betty") that explore a love triangle between James, Betty, and an unnamed teenager. It was the first song of the three that Swift wrote. According to Swift, she wanted to explore the idea of a girl in an undefined relationship: the lyrics are in the viewpoint of "August", who falls in love with James, who is already in a relationship with someone else. The song was inspired by what Swift described as the image of "the sun drenched month of August, sipped away like a bottle of wine". Throughout the song, imagery of late summer is prevalent: "Your back beneath the sun / Wishing I could write my name on it." Set in a suburban area with "salt air", "August" captures feelings of a teenage girl who goes through an unrequited love in the summer. She naively believes that she is in love, pondering on her summer romance: "August sipped away like a bottle of wine / Because you were never mine."

While the narrators of "Cardigan" and "Betty" are explicitly named, the narrator of "August" is never mentioned by name, which Vulture Nate Jones considered a highlight of her "relative unimportance in her lover's life". Swift said that she did not determine a name for the protagonist of "August", calling her "Augusta" or "Augustine" inside her head. As the summer romance progresses, the narrator is portrayed as unassertive and inexperienced, recalling the times when she "canceled my plans just in case you'd call". Though she knows she and James will never become a couple, she tells herself that it was enough "to live for the hope of it all". She attempts to run away with James: "Remember when I pulled up and said 'Get in the car' / And then canceled my plans just in case you'd call?" Finally, when the summer ends, so does the romance, and the narrator is left with a revelation: "You weren't mine to lose." Swift explained that after this summer romance, James and Betty later return to each other, while the "August" protagonist mourns the summer fling which she considered love.

Compared to the overarching folk sound of Folklore, "August" displays a more pop-oriented production. Aaron Dessner, a producer on Folklore, characterized it as the album's "closest thing to a pop song. It gets loud. It has this shimmering summer haze to it." Musically, "August" is a gloomy dream pop and guitar pop ballad incorporating 1990s-influenced guitars, vocal reverberation, and key changes. Its guitar arrangements are soft rock oriented. In The A.V. Club, Annie Zaleski noted the song features "shivering" string instruments, keyboards, and minimal synthesizers, and "subtle splotchy grooves". Writing for The Guardian, Laura Snapes wrote: "Her vocal trademarks remain in the yo-yoing vocal yelps." The outro of "August" is a "full orchestra major chord climax" according to Lucy Harbron of Clash.

Critical reception 
Critics praised the song's production and Swift's songwriting, and opined that the third-person perspective of its lyrics—a departure from Swift's trademark confessional narratives inspired by her personal life—showcased her maturity as a songwriter. Valerie Magan from Clash remarked that the lyrics feel "vouyeristic, as we lean in to hear all the stories that 'innocent-era' Swift would've kept secret". The same magazine's Lucy Harbron lauded Swift's ability to portray "niche" emotions and her storytelling prowess.

Music journalist Jody Rosen, in a review for the Los Angeles Times, appreciated the shift from "pure first-person subjectivity" to fictional narratives. Rolling Stone critic Rob Sheffield picked "August" as one of the album's highlights, calling the song "the album's most plainly beautiful ballad". He placed it fifth on his 2021 ranking of all the 199 songs of Swift's discography. Ellen Johnson from Paste labeled the track one of the best in Swift's discography as well.

The A.V. Club Annie Zaleski and Under the Radar Caleb Campbell both selected the song as one of Folklores best and compared the production to the music by Scottish dream pop band Cocteau Twins. The latter commented that the track serves as a testament to Swift's abilities of "writing the undeniably catchy hooks that make for a great pop song". While acknowledging Swift's indie reinvention on Folklore, Pitchfork Jillian Mapes opined that "August", along with other songs produced by Antonoff, are not really radical transformations, however still display signs of maturity. On behalf on Consequence of Sound, Katie Moulton was somewhat disappointed that the song's theme is not far from Swift's trademark "pop-culture tropes", but found certain lyrics original enough to "refresh the clichés". The Observer Kitty Empire provided a negative review, writing that the song does not succeed in experimenting beyond Swift's comfort zone.

"August" featured on lists of the best songs of 2020 by publications including Rolling Stone (No. 5), the Chicago Tribune (unranked), and Yahoo! (unranked). Complex Edwin Ortiz ranked it second on his year-end list. In Vulture list ranking all songs in Swift's discography, Jones wrote about "August": "Even in fiction, Swift's ability to capture the wistful ache of nostalgia remains unmatched." Sheffield picked it among the best five songs of Swift's discography: " 'August' feels like such a simple tune, yet it's one of the craftiest creations in the Swiftian Multiverse." Insider's Callie Ahlgrim named "August" as The Best Song of 2020.

Commercial performance 
Upon the release of Folklore, "August" debuted on various singles charts worldwide. In the United States, the song entered at number 23 on the Billboard Hot 100 chart dated August 8, 2020. It charted on the Hot 100 for two consecutive weeks. The song simultaneously debuted and peaked at number five on the Billboard Hot Rock & Alternative Songs, where it stayed for 20 weeks on the chart. "August" experienced a 39 percent gain in streams in the US in the 2021 month of August. In 2022, the song resurged once again the same month, with its daily streams skyrocketing up-to 277 percent. Billboard called it Swift's "seasonal streaming perennial" similar to Mariah Carey's "All I Want for Christmas Is You" (1994).

"August" peaked within the top 20 on singles charts of Malaysia (11), Singapore (12), Australia (13), and Canada (16), upon release. In Ireland, the song arrived on the Irish Singles Chart for the first time in August 2021, debuting at number 74, and reached a new peak of number 38 in August 2022. "August" further debuted on the UK Singles Chart in 2022, at number 78.

Live performances and cover versions 

At the 63rd Annual Grammy Awards on March 14, 2021, Swift performed "August" as part of a medley with "Cardigan" and "Willow", the latter was taken from her album Evermore. The performance was accompanied by the Folklore producers Jack Antonoff and Aaron Dessner, marking the first time the three performed together. She began with "Cardigan", singing while laying atop a cottage, before performing "August" on a guitar inside the cottage, accompanied by instruments from Antonoff and Dessner. The trio then stepped outside the cottage to perform the last song, "Willow". Music journalist Rob Sheffield ranked Swift's performance first on his list of the "10 Reasons We Loved the 2021 Grammys." Rolling Stone listed it as one of the top-five greatest Grammy performances of all time. "August" was included on the set list for the Eras Tour (2023).

American electropop band Muna covered "August" as one of the tracks for their live EP, Live at Electric Lady (2022).

Credits and personnel 
Credits adapted from Tidal.

 Taylor Swift – vocals, songwriter, producer
 Jack Antonoff – producer, songwriter, recording, live drums, percussion programming, electric guitar, acoustic guitar
 Joe Alwyn – producer
 Evan Smith – saxophones, flute, electric guitar, keyboards
 Bobby Hawk – strings
 Laura Sisk – recording
 Mike Williams – string recording
 Jon Gautier – string recording
 Jonathan Low – mixing, synth bass, synth bass recording
 Randy Merrill – mastering

Charts

Weekly charts

Year-end charts

Certification

Note

References 

2020s ballads
2020 songs
Pop ballads
Taylor Swift songs
Songs written by Taylor Swift
Songs written by Jack Antonoff
Song recordings produced by Jack Antonoff
Song recordings produced by Taylor Swift
Dream pop songs
Song recordings produced by Joe Alwyn